The Weather Below is Sister Sparrow & the Dirty Birds's second studio album, released on May 18, 2015 on Party Fowl Records, Thirty Tigers. The album is their first to be released on their own label, Party Fowl Records. The album was produced by Ryan Hadlock at Bear Creek Studio in a three week session.

Track list

References

2015 albums
Sister Sparrow & the Dirty Birds albums
Albums recorded at Bear Creek Studio